Malins may refer to:

Geoffrey Malins (1886–1940), a British film director
Humfrey Malins (born 1945), a British Conservative Party politician
Julian Malins (born 1950), a British barrister
Richard Malins (1805–1882), an English barrister, judge, and politician

See also
Germans Māliņš (born 1987), a Latvian professional footballer
Malin (disambiguation)